Fanwood is a borough in Union County, in the U.S. state of New Jersey. As of the 2020 United States census, the borough's population was 7,774, an increase of 456 (+6.2%) from the 2010 census count of 7,318, which in turn reflected an increase of 144 (+2.0%) from the 7,174 counted in the 2000 census.

Fanwood was incorporated as a borough by an act of the New Jersey Legislature on October 2, 1895, from portions of Fanwood Township (now known as Scotch Plains), based on the results of a referendum held the previous day. The borough was named for Fannie Wood, an author.

History
In 1831, the Elizabethtown and Somerville Railroad received a legislative charter to construct a railroad through the area. The line reached here in 1837 and a station, known as the Scotch Plains station, was built in 1839. The company became the Central Railroad of New Jersey in 1849. The line was later moved to reduce the grade and a new station, known as the Fanwood station, was built in 1874. At the same time, the Central New Jersey Land Improvement Company began development of Fanwood Park, a residential community around the station. The development featured curvilinear streets. John Taylor Johnston, then president of CNJ, named the community after his wife, Frances, also known as Fanny, according to his daughter, Emily. In 1878, Fanwood Township was created from Plainfield and Westfield Townships.

Historic district

The Fanwood Park Historic District is a  historic district located along North Avenue and North Martine Avenue in the community. It was added to the National Register of Historic Places on May 27, 2004 for its significance in architecture, community planning and development, landscape architecture, and transportation. The district has 57 contributing buildings, including the Fanwood station, which was previously listed individually on the NRHP. A key contributing property, the Georgian Revival style Urner/Gibbs house was built in 1894 by Benjamin Urner, as a wedding gift for his daughter who had married William M. Gibbs.

Geography
According to the United States Census Bureau, the borough had a total area of 1.34 square miles (3.47 km2), all of which was land.

The borough is bordered by Plainfield in the southwest and by Scotch Plains in all other directions.

The Robinsons Branch of the Rahway River additionally flows through Fanwood en route to the Robinson's Branch Reservoir.

Demographics

2010 census
   
The Census Bureau's 2006–2010 American Community Survey showed that (in 2010 inflation-adjusted dollars) median household income was $127,450 (with a margin of error of +/− $8,852) and the median family income was $135,833 (+/− $6,654). Males had a median income of $92,262 (+/− $13,007) versus $62,845 (+/− $6,933) for females. The per capita income for the borough was $43,194 (+/− $2,939). About 0.6% of families and 2.2% of the population were below the poverty line, including none of those under age 18 and 2.8% of those age 65 or over.

2000 census
As of the 2000 United States census there were 7,174 people, 2,574 households, and 2,054 families residing in the borough. The population density was 5,363.4 people per square mile (2,067.1/km2). There were 2,615 housing units at an average density of 1,955.0 per square mile (753.5/km2). The racial makeup of the borough was 88.30% White, 5.14% African American, 0.10% Native American, 4.39% Asian, 0.03% Pacific Islander, 0.79% from other races, and 1.24% from two or more races. Hispanic or Latino of any race were 3.74% of the population. Among Fanwood residents, 23.2% identified as being of Italian ancestry, 23.0% as being of Irish ancestry and 20.6% as having German ancestry.

There were 2,574 households, out of which 38.5% had children under the age of 18 living with them, 70.0% were married couples living together, 7.7% had a female householder with no husband present, and 20.2% were non-families. 18.0% of all households were made up of individuals, and 10.0% had someone living alone who was 65 years of age or older. The average household size was 2.76 and the average family size was 3.13.

In the borough the population was spread out, with 25.8% under the age of 18, 4.5% from 18 to 24, 31.3% from 25 to 44, 23.8% from 45 to 64, and 14.7% who were 65 years of age or older. The median age was 39 years. For every 100 females, there were 91.2 males. For every 100 females age 18 and over, there were 87.9 males.

The median income for a household in the borough was $85,233, and the median income for a family was $99,232. Males had a median income of $65,519 versus $40,921 for females. The per capita income for the borough was $34,804. About 1.6% of families and 3.4% of the population were below the poverty line, including 2.6% of those under age 18 and 6.5% of those age 65 or over.

Economy

In 2014 Fanwood was recipient of a 2014 New Jersey Future Smart Growth Award for its downtown development plan.

Government

Local government
Fanwood is governed under the Borough form of New Jersey municipal government, which is used in 218 municipalities (of the 564) statewide, making it the most common form of government in New Jersey. The governing body is comprised of the Mayor and the Borough Council, with all positions elected at-large on a partisan basis as part of the November general election. The Mayor is elected directly by the voters to a four-year term of office. The Borough Council is comprised of six members elected to serve three-year terms on a staggered basis, with two seats coming up for election each year in a three-year cycle. The Borough form of government used by Fanwood is a "weak mayor / strong council" government in which council members act as the legislative body with the mayor presiding at meetings and voting only in the event of a tie. The mayor can veto ordinances subject to an override by a two-thirds majority vote of the council. The mayor makes committee and liaison assignments for council members, and most appointments are made by the mayor with the advice and consent of the council.

The Borough Council is Fanwood's legislative body and may pass, adopt, amend and repeal any ordinance or where permitted, any resolution, for any purpose required for the government of the municipality, and also controls and regulates the finances of the municipality. The Council may investigate any activity of the municipality, remove any officer of the municipality for cause other than those excepted by law and shall have all the executive responsibilities of the municipality not placed by general law, in the office of the Mayor. The Mayor of Fanwood is responsible for serving as the chief executive officer of borough government. The mayor presides over the Borough Council, appoints various boards and committees, oversees borough administration, and serves as the borough's ceremonial head.

, the Mayor of Fanwood Borough is Democrat Colleen M. Mahr, whose term of office ends December 31, 2023. Members of the Fanwood Borough Council are Council President Erin A. McElroy-Barker (D, 2024), Jeffrey Banks (D, 2023), Anthony Carter (D, 2023), Francine Glaser (D, 2022), Katherine Mitchell (D, 2022) and Patricia Walsh (D, 2024).

In January 2019, Jeffrey Banks was appointed to fill the seat expiring in December 2020 that had been held by Russell Huegel until he resigned from office to accept the position as the borough's municipal attorney.

Fire department
The Fanwood Fire Department is a volunteer fire department with 30 members that operate out of one fire station.  The department has two engines, one quint and a chief's vehicle. The Fanwood Volunteer Fire Company predates the incorporation of the borough, having first been established in 1890 with its first firehouse constructed in 1897.

Federal, state, and county representation
Fanwood is located in the 7th Congressional District and is part of New Jersey's 22nd state legislative district. 

 

Union County is governed by a Board of County Commissioners, whose nine members are elected at-large to three-year terms of office on a staggered basis with three seats coming up for election each year, with an appointed County Manager overseeing the day-to-day operations of the county. At an annual reorganization meeting held in the beginning of January, the board selects a Chair and Vice Chair from among its members. , Union County's County Commissioners are 
Chair Rebecca Williams (D, Plainfield, term as commissioner and as chair ends December 31, 2022), 
Vice Chair Christopher Hudak (D, Linden, term as commissioner ends 2023; term as vice chair ends 2022),
James E. Baker Jr. (D, Rahway, 2024),
Angela R. Garretson (D, Hillside, 2023),
Sergio Granados (D, Elizabeth, 2022),
Bette Jane Kowalski (D, Cranford, 2022), 
Lourdes M. Leon (D, Elizabeth, 2023),
Alexander Mirabella (D, Fanwood, 2024) and 
Kimberly Palmieri-Mouded (D, Westfield, 2024).
Constitutional officers elected on a countywide basis are
County Clerk Joanne Rajoppi (D, Union Township, 2025),
Sheriff Peter Corvelli (D, Kenilworth, 2023) and
Surrogate Susan Dinardo (acting).
The County Manager is Edward Oatman.

Politics
As of March 2011, there were a total of 5,033 registered voters in Fanwood, of which 1,614 (32.1% vs. 41.8% countywide) were registered as Democrats, 1,210 (24.0% vs. 15.3%) were registered as Republicans and 2,205 (43.8% vs. 42.9%) were registered as Unaffiliated. There were 4 voters registered as Libertarians or Greens. Among the borough's 2010 Census population, 68.8% (vs. 53.3% in Union County) were registered to vote, including 95.1% of those ages 18 and over (vs. 70.6% countywide).

In the 2012 presidential election, Democrat Barack Obama received 2,164 votes (54.8% vs. 66.0% countywide), ahead of Republican Mitt Romney with 1,710 votes (43.3% vs. 32.3%) and other candidates with 49 votes (1.2% vs. 0.8%), among the 3,947 ballots cast by the borough's 5,239 registered voters, for a turnout of 75.3% (vs. 68.8% in Union County). In the 2008 presidential election, Democrat Barack Obama received 2,287 votes (54.7% vs. 63.1% countywide), ahead of Republican John McCain with 1,817 votes (43.5% vs. 35.2%) and other candidates with 37 votes (0.9% vs. 0.9%), among the 4,179 ballots cast by the borough's 5,143 registered voters, for a turnout of 81.3% (vs. 74.7% in Union County). In the 2004 presidential election, Democrat John Kerry received 2,045 votes (50.2% vs. 58.3% countywide), ahead of Republican George W. Bush with 1,957 votes (48.1% vs. 40.3%) and other candidates with 41 votes (1.0% vs. 0.7%), among the 4,070 ballots cast by the borough's 5,013 registered voters, for a turnout of 81.2% (vs. 72.3% in the whole county).

In the 2013 gubernatorial election, Republican Chris Christie received 58.8% of the vote (1,503 cast), ahead of Democrat Barbara Buono with 39.3% (1,003 votes), and other candidates with 1.9% (49 votes), among the 2,604 ballots cast by the borough's 5,151 registered voters (49 ballots were spoiled), for a turnout of 50.6%. In the 2009 gubernatorial election, Republican Chris Christie received 1,468 votes (50.2% vs. 41.7% countywide), ahead of Democrat Jon Corzine with 1,140 votes (39.0% vs. 50.6%), Independent Chris Daggett with 276 votes (9.4% vs. 5.9%) and other candidates with 16 votes (0.5% vs. 0.8%), among the 2,922 ballots cast by the borough's 5,064 registered voters, yielding a 57.7% turnout (vs. 46.5% in the county).

Education

Public school students in Fanwood attend the schools of the Scotch Plains-Fanwood Regional School District, which serves students in pre-kindergarten through twelfth grade from Fanwood and Scotch Plains. The district has five elementary schools (Pre-K/K–4), two middle schools (5–8) and a comprehensive high school (9–12), all of which are located in Scotch Plains. Students from School One, Evergreen and Brunner pool into Park Middle School, while students from Coles and McGinn feed into Terrill. School One is the only elementary school that teaches English as a second language. Most students from Park Middle School and Terrill Middle school continue their high school education at the Scotch Plains-Fanwood High School. As of the 2018–19 school year, the district, comprised of eight schools, had an enrollment of 5,649 students and 438.0 classroom teachers (on an FTE basis), for a student–teacher ratio of 12.9:1. Seats on the district's nine-member board of education are allocated based on the population of the constituent districts, with two seats assigned to Fanwood.

Schools in the district (with 2018–19 enrollment data from the National Center for Education Statistics) are 
Howard B. Brunner Elementary School with 414 students in grades Pre-K–4, 
J. Ackerman Coles School with 552 students in grades Pre-K–4, 
Evergreen School with 402 students in grades Pre-K–4, 
William J. McGinn School with 512 students in grades K–4, 
School One with 395 students in grades Pre-K–4, 
Park Middle School with 909 students in grades 5–8, 
Terrill Middle School with 811 students in grades 5–8 and 
Scotch Plains-Fanwood High School with 1,574 students in grades 9–12.

Transportation

Roads and highways

Route 28 (known in Fanwood as South Avenue) passes through the borough, connecting Plainfield and Scotch Plains.

Another major thoroughfare is South and North Martine Avenue, which connects Fanwood to U.S. Route 22 .

Public transportation

The Fanwood station is an NJ Transit railroad station on the Raritan Valley Line. The building on the north side of the tracks (westbound platform) is a Victorian building and, like the north building at Westfield station, is used by a non-profit organization.  The ticket office is in the station building on the south side of the tracks (eastbound platform). The station provides service to Penn Station in Newark, and from there to Hoboken Terminal or Penn Station in Midtown Manhattan.

Currently riders can take one seat rides to Penn Station in Midtown Manhattan during rush hour on weekdays, with transfer at Newark Penn Station required to reach to New York Penn Station at all other times, including weekends. The Raritan Valley Railroad Coalition has been promoting economic benefits of one-seat rider to New York City since 1998. RVRC has so far succeeded to achieve such one seat riders during off peak hours during week and there are 9 trains in each direction that the riders do not need to transfer at Newark Penn Station. Ultimate goal of RVRC is to extend such one seat rider in during rush hours.  One seat rider would have been achieved with the Access to the Region's Core tunnel program, but this was cancelled by then Governor Chris Christie.

NJ Transit offers bus service to and from the Port Authority Bus Terminal in Midtown Manhattan on the 113 and local service on the 822 route.

Newark Liberty International Airport is approximately 25 minutes away to the east.

Notable people

People who were born in, residents of, or otherwise closely associated with Fanwood include:

 Edith Ajello (born 1944), politician who has served as a member of the Rhode Island House of Representatives
 H. W. Ambruster (1879–1961), football coach, chemical engineer, actor and lecturer
 Bill Austin (born ), former football player
 Derrick Caracter (born 1988), power forward/center who played for the Los Angeles Lakers, now with A.S. Ramat HaSharon of the Israeli Liga Leumit
 Maryanne Connelly (born 1945), former mayor of Fanwood
 Gerry Cooney (born 1956), boxer
 Róisín Egenton, selected The Rose of Tralee in 2000
 Eleanor C. Lambertsen (1916–1998), nurse who was inducted into the American Nurses Association Hall of Fame in 2012
 William Lowell Jr. (1863–1954), golf tee manufacturer
 Hiram Maxim (1840–1916), inventor of the Maxim gun, a curling iron, fire sprinklers, and other devices
 Hiram Percy Maxim (1869–1936), inventor, radio pioneer and founder of the American Radio Relay League
 Zahid Quraishi, United States Magistrate Judge of the United States District Court for the District of New Jersey who is an announced nominee to be a United States district judge of the same court
 Todd D. Robinson (born ), American diplomat who was U.S. ambassador to Guatemala and Venezuela, and is now a senior advisor for Central America in the Bureau of Western Hemisphere Affairs
 Linda Stender (born 1951), member of the New Jersey General Assembly, and former mayor of Fanwood
 Robert T. Stevens (1899–1983), businessman and former chairman of J.P. Stevens and Company
 Sada Thompson (1927–2011), actress
 Thomas Chatterton Williams (born 1981), cultural critic and author, whose works include the 2019 book Self-Portrait in Black and White

See also
National Register of Historic Places listings in Union County, New Jersey

References

External links

 Fanwood Borough website
 Fanwood Environmental Commission

 
1895 establishments in New Jersey
Borough form of New Jersey government
Boroughs in Union County, New Jersey
Populated places established in 1895